Night sweats, also referred to as nocturnal hyperhidrosis (Hyperhidrosis - a medical term for excessive sweating  + nocturnal - night), is the repeated occurrence of excessive sweating during sleep. The person may or may not also perspire excessively while awake.

One of the most common causes of night sweats in women over 40 is the hormonal changes related to menopause and perimenopause. This is a very common occurrence during the menopausal transition years. Over 80% of women experience hot flashes, which may include excessive sweating, during menopause.

Night sweats range from being relatively harmless to a sign of underlying disease. Night sweats may happen because the sleep environment is too warm, either because the bedroom is unusually hot or because there are too many covers on the bed.  Night sweats have been associated with a long list of clinical conditions. However, there is very little evidence that supports clinical recommendations for this condition.

Associated conditions
The condition may be a sign of various disease states, including but not exclusive to the following:

Cancers
Lymphoma
Leukemia
Infections
HIV/AIDS
Tuberculosis
Mycobacterium avium-intracellulare infection
Infectious mononucleosis
Fungal infections (histoplasmosis, coccidioidomycosis)
Lung abscess
Infective endocarditis
Brucellosis
Pneumocystis pneumonia (most often - in immunocompromised individuals)
Omicron variant of COVID-19
Endocrine disorders
Premature ovarian failure
Hyperthyroidism
Diabetes mellitus (nocturnal hypoglycemia)
Endocrine tumors (pheochromocytoma, carcinoid)
Orchiectomy
Rheumatic disorders
Takayasu's arteritis
Temporal arteritis
Other
Obstructive sleep apnea
Gastroesophageal reflux disease
Chronic fatigue syndrome
Fibromyalgia
Granulomatous disease
Chronic eosinophilic pneumonia
Lymphoid hyperplasia
Diabetes insipidus
Prinzmetal's angina
Anxiety
Pregnancy
Menopause
Drugs
Antipyretics (salicylates, acetaminophen)
Antihypertensives
Anabolic–androgenic steroids, in particular trenbolone, and the nandrolones 
Dinitrophenol - a common side effect
Phenothiazines
Drug withdrawal: ethanol, benzodiazepines, cannabis, heroin (and other opioids),
Over-bundling
Autonomic over-activity
Inflammatory bowel disease (IBD) - Crohn's disease/ulcerative colitis

References

External links 

Sleep disorders
Medical signs
Menopause